The Rapid Response Unit (URNA) is a special force of the Police of the Czech Republic. It is under command of the Ministry of the Interior.

History
In 1981, the Útvar zvláštního určení (ÚZU) was established in 1981 as part of the Sbor národní bezpečnosti (SNB) with its members recruited from airborne units and issued with red berets. In 1985, the unit was renamed Odbor zvláštního určení (OZU). After the Velvet Revolution in 1989, the unit was renamed Jednotka rychlého zásahu Federální policejní služby (JRZ FPS) and it members issued with green berets. In 1992, the unit was renamed the Rapid response unit and in 1993 it members were issued red berets.

The unit conducts about 40 operations a year and has served internationally including in Afghanistan, Iraq and Pakistan providing protection to Czech embassies. Members of the unit have served in the United Nations Interim Administration Mission in Kosovo (UNIMIK) in Kosovo as part of Special Team Six.

Organization
The Rapid response unit is divided into three sections:

1. Rapid Deployment Section – consists of three intervention groups (Specialists, Pyrotechnists, Training Group).

2. Special Services Section – consists of members with specific specializations such as snipers, signalman, negotiators, drivers.

3. Administrative and Logistics Section – provides organizational, material and staffing, including the secretariat, a lawyer and administrative staff.

Training

Members of the Czech Police with at least three years of service (or an academic degree) can join the URNA. The basis is a special-tactical training, shooting preparation, work at heights and self defense along with airborne and topographical and medical training. URNA practices with foreign units such as 22 SAS, GSG9, GIGN, etc.

Required properties are as follows:

a) Intelligence – Average to above average. The ability to learn. Define and solve problems in stressful environments.

b) Ambition and self-discipline – know your own abilities, work on yourself.

c) Flexibility and adaptability – unconventional thinking, inventiveness, ability to improvise.

d) Maturity – it is intended behavior devoid of impulsiveness, naivety, exaggeration, internal discipline.

e) Psychosomatic stability – related to emotional stability. The candidate should not be subject to psychosomatic problems.

f) Emotional stability – patience, the ability to withstand criticism.

g) Emotional mood – optimism, sense of humor, without sudden fluctuations.

h) Social adaptability – friendly and open meeting, respect to authority, adopt rules of group.

i) Aggression and courage – to show targeted and controllable aggression. Courage with self-preservation, no stunt.

j) High frustration tolerance – the ability to remain operational and focused on meeting targets during break, waiting and disturbing influences.

k) Sense of justice, honesty, conscientiousness and positive motivation to work.

Equipment
Glock 17 standard issue
Glock 26 concealed carry 
Heckler & Koch MP7 submachine gun replacing/heavily complementing the MP5 submachine gun.
Heckler & Koch MP5 submachine gun, MP5A5, MP5K-PDW, MP5SD6
Heckler & Koch G36K currently being replaced by HK 416
Heckler & Koch HK416A5 assault rifles in various versions/configurations.
Heckler & Koch HK417 Used as a sniper support rifle and support from a helicopter. 
SAKO TRG 22 and TRG 42 Was replaced by AI AXMC within URNA but is still used by Czech regional SWAT units. 
Accuracy International AXMC Sniper Rifle.
Benelli M3-T Was used for door breaching
FN Minimi Bought in small number for foreign operation. 
HK 69A1 grenade launcher Mostly used for training with various types of ammo. 
Nomex gloves
P1 Flashbang After explosion, 14 small explosives come out to all directions and each one of them provides flash and loud bang
Rheinmetall Nico Flashbangs

Former equipment
CZ 75B Was replaced by Glock
Beretta 92FS Complemented the CZ 75B
Walther P99 Small amount was bought alongside the Glock 17
SA Vz. 58 Was a standard issue rifle for foreign missions. 
Was updated after some time with FAB Defense parts such as telescopic stock and handguard with MIL-STD rails. Later on the Vz. 58 was replaced by H&K G36K
SVD Dragunov
SIG SSG-3000 Used to be a standard sniper rifle, was replaced by SAKO TRG 22 and TRG 42 due to SSG-3000 production ended.

References

ATLAS Network
Government agencies established in 1981
Law enforcement in the Czech Republic
Law enforcement in Czechoslovakia
Non-military counterterrorist organizations
Police tactical units
1981 establishments in Czechoslovakia